Saint-Bris-le-Vineux is a commune in the Yonne department in Bourgogne-Franche-Comté in north-central France.

It lies near Auxerre.

Twin towns
  - Schoden, Germany
  - Wrea Green, UK

See also
 Saint-Bris AOC, a white wine from the area around Saint-Bris-le-Vineux, made from Sauvignon variety grapes.
Communes of the Yonne department

References

External links

 www.domaine-des-remparts.com: Local culture and Wines from Saint-Bris
 www.domaineduraisindor.com, for more information on the wines from Saint-Bris-le-Vineux
 www.millotdesign.com, for more information on the design from Saint-Bris-le-Vineux
 www.bailly-lapierre.fr, for information about the caves at Bailly and their Crémant de Bourgogne

Communes of Yonne